CDT1 (Chromatin licensing and DNA replication factor 1) is a protein that in humans is encoded by the CDT1 gene. It is a licensing factor that functions to limit DNA from replicating more than once per cell cycle.

Role in pre-replication complexes 
The protein encoded by this gene is a key licensing factor in the assembly of pre-replication complexes (pre-RC), which occurs during the G1 phase of the cell cycle. In the assembly of pre-RCs, origin recognition complexes (ORC1-6) recognize and bind to DNA replication origins. CDT1, along with the protein CDC6, are then recruited to the forming pre-RC, followed by minichromosome maintenance complexes (MCM2-7).

The activity of CDT1 during the cell cycle is tightly regulated during the S phase by the protein geminin, which inhibits it, and by SCFSKP2, which ubiquinates the protein to tag it for proteasomal degradation. This regulation is important in preventing relicensing, thus ensuring that DNA is only replicated once per cell cycle.

Orthologs
CDT1 belongs to a family of replication proteins conserved from yeast to humans. Examples of orthologs in other species include:
 S. pombe – CDT1 (CDC10-dependent transcript 1)
 Drosophila melanogaster – 'double parked' or Dup
 Xenopus laevis - CDT1

Interactions 
DNA replication factor CDT1 has been shown to interact with SKP2. Cdt1 is recruited by the origin recognition complex in origin licensing. Null-mutations for CDT1 are lethal in yeast; the spores undergo mitosis without DNA replication. The overexpression of CDT1 causes rereplication in H. sapiens, which activates the Chk1 pathway, preventing entry into mitosis.

References

Further reading

External links 
 
 

Proteins
DNA replication